Mouftaou Adoun (born 10 April 1991, in Cotonou) is a Beninese football player who currently plays in Benin for Port Autonome.

Career
Adou began his career with ASPAC Cotonou and joined after the 2010 African Cup of Nations in February 2010 to Benin Premier League club Port Autonome-ASPAC. He was in February 2010 on trial and would sign with SK Sturm Graz, but his club Port Autonome denied the player this movement.

International career
Adoun was part of the Benin national football team at 2010 African Cup of Nations in Angola.

References

1991 births
Living people
Beninese footballers
Benin international footballers
2010 Africa Cup of Nations players
Expatriate footballers in Senegal
People from Cotonou
Port Autonome players

Association football defenders